Mislav Grgić (born in 1973 in Osijek, Croatia) is a university professor, scientist, Ph.D. in technical sciences, electrical engineer. He served as a Dean of FER from 2014 until 2018. He is a Head of the Alumni Community of FER since December 2018, with more than 20,000 members, and he is a Special Advisor to the Rector of the University of Zagreb for STEM Disciplines and International Projects. He is a full member of the Academia Europaea - The Academy of Europe and a full member of the Croatian Academy of Engineering. He was a science advisor to the President of the Management Board of Končar - Electrical Industry, the largest electrical engineering company in Croatia.

Biography 
Mislav Grgić was born in 1973 in Osijek, Croatia. He received B.Sc., M.Sc. and Ph.D. degrees in electrical engineering from the University of Zagreb, Faculty of Electrical Engineering and Computing (FER), Zagreb, Croatia, in 1997, 1998 and 2000, respectively.

He has been working at the Department of Communication and Space Technologies  at FER since July 1997. He was a visiting researcher at the University of Essex, United Kingdom (1999/2000). He has been promoted to the position of Full Professor since June 2010 and to the permanent position since January 2016.

Mislav Grgić  participated in 15 international and 13 domestic scientific projects - in the area of electrical engineering, computing and ICT. He co-authored more than 200 research and professional papers published in books, journals and conference proceedings  in the area of image and video compression, content-based image retrieval, face recognition and medical imaging (i.e. digital mammography, computer-aided detection and diagnosis of breast cancer). He was an editor of four scientific books, co-author of four book chapters and a guest editor of four special issues of international scientific journals. He is a member of more than 110 international program and organizing committees of scientific conferences.

Mislav Grgić  is highly cited scientists at the University of Zagreb, with more than 5,000 citations according to Google Scholar database (h-index = 32).

Academic activities 
Mislav Grgić was a dean of the Faculty of Electrical Engineering and Computing (FER), University of Zagreb, Croatia (2014-2018; the youngest ever elected dean), and a vice dean for research of FER (2010-2014). He has become a head of the alumni community, with more than 20,000 members, since December 2018. He has also been appointed as a special advisor to the rector of the University of Zagreb for STEM disciplines and international projects  since October 2015. He was a science advisor to the president of the management board of "Končar - Electrical Industry", the largest electrical engineering company in Croatia, for two years (2019-2020).

He was a deputy president of the "Energy Platform Living Lab - Association for Open Innovations in Energy Sector" (2014-2018), and a president of the board of directors of institution "Innovation Center Nikola Tesla" (2015-2018).

Mislav Grgić initiated, organized and conducted a project that resulted in creation of a new database: "SCface - Surveillance Cameras Face Database", pioneering database for testing face recognition in real-world conditions. The SCface database was downloaded by more than 400 research groups located in 60 countries since January 2010. SCface database has a multidisciplinary importance: it is used not only in engineering and computer science fields but also in other fields like neuroscience, psychology, and psychiatry, what can be seen from the citations to this database from the corresponding research papers. SCface database is also used by military officials, police departments, and several renowned companies (e.g. Samsung, Bosch, Panasonic, LG Electronics, IBM, Amazon, NEC, and Visa Research).

Mislav Grgić initiated, organized, and developed a web-site "Face Recognition Homepage", academic and research portal that become a starting point on the web for every face recognition researcher. This web-site is an information pool for the face recognition community that provides an entry point for novices as well as a centralized information resource to concentrate face recognition and related scientific efforts. The importance of the web-site could be seen from the fact that it was described in the section "NetWatch" of the Science Magazine, one of the world's top academic journals.

Scientific and professional organizations 
Mislav Grgić has been elected as a Full Member of the Academia Europaea - The Academy of Europe since July 2019. Academia Europaea is based in London, and founded in 1988. In the Academia Europaea, among others, there are over 70 Nobel Prize winners.

He has been accepted as a full member of the Croatian Academy of Engineering (HATZ)  since 2012, where he was a collaborating member from 2004 to 2012. He served as a Chair of the IEEE Croatia Section (2013-2016), that has approx. 700 members. He also served as a member of the Committee for International Cooperation at HATZ (2009-2013).

He was a member of the Working Group for the preparation of negotiations for the accession of the Republic of Croatia to the European Union, responsible for the Chapter 10 of the acquis communautaire: "Information Society and Media" (2005-2008). He was an appointed member of the Committee on Transportation, Communications and Maritime Affairs of the Croatian Parliament (2008-2011) 

He is a Senior Member of IEEE and a Senior Member of SPIE. He is also a member of IEEE Signal Processing Society, IEEE Engineering in Medicine and Biology Society, IEEE Computer Society, IEEE Communications Society, IEEE Computational Intelligence Society, EURASIP, ELMAR, and AMAC-FER.

Honors and awards 

 2020 "Josip Loncar" gold medal of the Faculty of Electrical Engineering and Computing, University of Zagreb for the great contribution to the development and successful management of the Faculty, for a scientific contribution in the field of digital image processing and multimedia communications, for the popularization of science and for the general enhancement of the reputation of the Faculty through its scientific research and professional work;
2019 The Croatian State Science Award for 2018 for popularization of technical sciences (with three co-awardees), presented in Croatian Parliament;
 2019 The Order of the Croatian Star with the Effigy of Ruđer Bošković for extraordinary service in scientific work, popularization of science and attracting international projects, awarded by H. E. Mrs. Kolinda Grabar-Kitarović, President of Republic of Croatia;
 2017 IEEE Croatia Section Distinguished Service Award for longtime contribution towards successful activities and international promotion of the IEEE Croatia Section, especially during his terms as a Chair of the IEEE Croatia Section from 2013 until 2016;
 2017 The highest award in the field of technical sciences of the University of Zagreb - "Fran Bošnjaković" Award - for notable results in scientific, teaching and professional work and the promotion of scientific discipline and profession;
 2017 The highest award of the City of Zagreb for great contribution to scientific work and activities in Zagreb;
 2016 Special Recognition of the Rector of the University of Zagreb for committed and engaged work in university committees and boards and for foundation and development of the strategic investment project "Innovation Center Nikola Tesla" at the University of Zagreb;
 2015 Medal of the Electric Traction Division of the Warsaw University of Technology on the 90th Anniversary of Electric Traction Teaching at the Warsaw University of Technology;
 2005 Young scientist award "Vera Johanides" of the Croatian Academy of Engineering (HATZ) for scientific achievements in the area of multimedia communications;
 1999-2000 "The British Scholarship Trust" fellowship;
 1999 "Josip Loncar" silver medal of the Faculty of Electrical Engineering and Computing, University of Zagreb for the outstanding M.Sc. thesis work;
 1997 "Josip Loncar" bronze medal of the Faculty of Electrical Engineering and Computing, University of Zagreb for the outstanding B.Sc. thesis work;
 1994, 1995, 1996, and 1997 Rector's Award of University of Zagreb;
 1994-1997 The City of Zagreb Merit Scholarship.

Other activities 
Mislav Grgić is a founder and first chair of the program "ŠUZA - From School to Science and Academic Community" - official FER's popularization program that is conducted in cooperation with elementary and secondary schools in Croatia. He is a co-founder and a president (prefect) of the Academic Male Choir of FER  (the biggest male choir in Croatia) and Women Singing Choir "Rezonanca" of FER. He is an honorary member of the Croatian Singing Society "Slavulj" Petrinja, the oldest singing society in Croatia, founded in 1864, with only six honorary members in their 156-years long history.

He is a Knight of the Order of St. George - a European order of the k. und k. House of Habsburg-Lorraine. He is also a member of The Society of Brethren of the Croatian Dragonthe - as the Dragon Strossmayer's - where he is serving as 10th Grand Master (2021-2026), and he was also serving as a Herald - Head of the Dragons' Heraldic Office (2017-2019). He was also a member of the management committee (2017-2021) of medieval castle in Ozalj, Croatia - first mentioned in 1244. He is a member of the Brotherhood (Fraternity) of All Saints in Korcula, founded in 1301 and a member of the Croatian Heraldic & Vexillological Association.

He is a founder of several non-governmental organizations (NGOs): Croatian Council of the European Movement, Croatian Club for International Cooperation, Croatian Junior Chamber, and Croatian Academic-Business Club.

Personal life 
He is married to Sonja Grgić  (maiden: Bauer), university professor, with whom he has one child. He is a Christian of Roman Catholic denomination.

Bibliography 

 Google Scholar profile: https://scholar.google.com/citations?user=IyLtdscAAAAJ
 Scopus Author ID: https://www.scopus.com/authid/detail.uri?authorId=56234047900
 ResearcherID: http://www.researcherid.com/rid/B-6128-2008
 ORCID profile: http://orcid.org/0000-0001-6230-3734

External links 

 Personal homepage: https://www.mislavgrgic.info/

References 

1973 births
21st-century Croatian scientists
University of Zagreb
University of Zagreb alumni
Living people
Scientists from Zagreb
Croatian scientists
Croatian electrical engineers
Academic staff of the University of Zagreb
Faculty of Electrical Engineering and Computing, University of Zagreb alumni
Members of Academia Europaea